The White Horse Sessions is a live album by Nightnoise. The album was released by Windham Hill Records (01934 11195-2) in 1997.

Track listing 

 "Silky Flanks" by Brian Dunning (4:55)   
 "Shadow of Time" by Tríona Ní Dhomhnaill (3:32)   
 "Jig of Sorts" by Tríona Ní Dhomhnaill (3:52)   
 "Shuan" by Mícheál Ó Domhnaill (5:50)   
 "Do We?" by Brian Dunning (4:43)   
 "Murrach Na Gealaich (Murdo of the Moon)" by Johnny Cunningham (3:59)   
 "Hugh" by Tríona Ní Dhomhnaill (4:11)   
 "Moondance" by Van Morrison (6:28)   
 "Heartwood" by Tríona Ní Dhomhnaill (4:32)   
 "The Cricket's Wicket" by Mícheál Ó Domhnaill (6:23)   
 "Night in That Land" by Johnny Cunningham (3:39)   
 "At the Races" by Tríona Ní Dhomhnaill (3:33)

Credits 

 Mícheál Ó Domhnaill – guitar, whistle, 
 Tríona Ní Dhomhnaill – vocals, piano, synthesizer 
 Brian Dunning – flute, whistle 
 Johnny Cunningham – fiddle 
 Nightnoise – producers
 Tom Luekens – associate producer 
 Bob Stark – engineer
 Mike Sakabayashi – design 
 Recorded live at The White Horse Studio in Portland, OR on 25–26 March 1996 
 Recorded live in Malaga, Spain on 17 October 1995 (tracks 4,11,12)

References 

1997 albums
Nightnoise albums